Vicenç Mateu Zamora (born 3 December 1961) is an Andorran diplomat and politician. He was the General Syndic (speaker) of General Council, Andorra's unicameral legislative body. He has a doctoral degree in Philosophy, Master in Business Administration (MBA) and also studied law. He worked as a professor of philosophy and literature at San Ermengol School and UNED. He was the Andorra ambassador to Spain and France, delegate to UNESCO. He was Secretary General of the Ministry of Technical Education, Culture and Youth (1990–91), and founding member of the National Democratic Initiative (IDN), the national leader of IDN (1993, 1996), general counsel for two terms (1994-1997 and 1997-2001) and founding member of New Centre (NC).

External links
 Official biography, Principality of Andorra

Living people
1961 births
Ambassadors of Andorra to France
Ambassadors of Andorra to Spain
General Syndics of the General Council (Andorra)
People from Escaldes-Engordany